DuPage County is a county in the U.S. state of Illinois, and one of the collar counties of the Chicago metropolitan area. As of the 2020 census, the population was 932,877, making it Illinois' second-most populous county. Its county seat is Wheaton.

Known for its vast tallgrass prairies, DuPage County has become mostly developed and suburbanized, although some pockets of farmland remain in the county's western and northern parts. Located in the Rust Belt, the area is one of few in the region whose economy quickly became dependent on the headquarters of several large corporations due to its close proximity to Chicago. As steel mills closed in the 1970s and 1980s, several acres that were formerly industrialized areas were converted into business parks to meet the growing tax base. The county has a mixed socioeconomic profile and residents of Hinsdale, Naperville and Oak Brook include some of the wealthiest people in the Midwest. However, other cities in the county such as Aurora and Downers Grove have faced issues regarding local small business growth, affordable housing and elevating crime rates. On the whole, the county enjoys above average median household income levels and low overall poverty levels when compared to the national average. In 2018, Niche ranked two DuPage municipalities (Clarendon Hills at #22 and Naperville at #128) amongst the best places to live in America.

History
DuPage County was formed on February 9, 1839, out of Cook County. The county took its name from the DuPage River, which was, in turn, named after a French fur trapper, DuPage. The first written history to address the name, the 1882 History of DuPage County, Illinois, by Rufus Blanchard, relates:

The DuPage River had, from time immemorial, been a stream well known. It took its name from a French trader who settled on this stream below the fork previous to 1800. Hon. H. W. Blodgett, of Waukegan, informs the writer that J. B. Beaubien had often spoken to him of the old Frenchman, Du Page, whose station was on the bank of the river, down toward its mouth, and stated that the river took its name from him. The county name must have the same origin. Col Gurden S. Hubbard, who came into the country in 1818, informs the writer that the name DuPage, as applied to the river then, was universally known, but the trader for whom it was named lived there before his time. Mr. Beaubien says it is pronounced Du Pazhe (having the sound of ah, and that the P should be capitalized). This was in reply to Mr. Blodgett’s inquiry of him concerning the matter.

The first white settler in DuPage County was Bailey Hobson who, with Lewis Stewart, built a house in 1831 for the Hobson family at a site about 2 miles south of present-day downtown Naperville.  Hobson later built a mill to serve surrounding farmers.  Today, the Hobson house still stands on Hobson Road in Naperville, and the location of the mill is commemorated with a millstone and monument in today's Pioneer Park.

Geography
The DuPage River and the Salt Creek flow through DuPage County.

Climate

Adjacent counties
Counties that are adjacent to DuPage include:
 Cook County (east and north)
 Will County (south)
 Kendall County (southwest; counties meet at a corner)
 Kane County (west)

Demographics

DuPage County's population's distribution by race and ethnicity in the 2020 census was as follows:

DuPage County has become more diverse. The population of foreign-born residents increased from about 71,300 in 1990 to 171,000 by 2009 estimates.

There were 325,601 households, out of which 37.00% had children under the age of 18 living with them, 60.90% were married couples living together, 7.90% had a female householder with no husband present and 28.00% were non-families. 22.90% of all households were made up of individuals, and 6.80% had someone living alone who was 65 years of age or older. The average household size was 2.73 and the average family size was 3.27.

In the county, the population was spread out, with 26.70% under the age of 18, 8.20% from 18 to 24, 32.40% from 25 to 44, 22.80% from 45 to 64 and 9.80% who were 65 years of age or older. The median age was 35 years. For every 100 females, there were 97.20 males. For every 100 females, age 18 and over, there were 94.20 males.

The median income for a household in the county was $98,441 and the median income for a family was $113,086. Males had a median income of $60,909 versus $41,346 for females. The mean or average income for a family in DuPage County is $121,009, according to the 2005 census. The per capita income for the county was $38,458. About 2.40% of families and 3.60% of the population were below the poverty line, including 3.90% of those under age 18 and 4.30% of those age 65 or over.

Religion

DuPage County has several hundred Christian churches, and especially around Wheaton is a Bible Belt, with Wheaton College and various other evangelical Christian colleges, and publishing houses including InterVarsity Press, Crossway, Tyndale House, Christianity Today and other smaller ones in the area. Well-known churches include the Community Christian Church of Naperville, College Church of Wheaton, Wheaton Bible Church, and First Baptist Church of Wheaton. There is also a large Catholic population, the county being part of the Diocese of Joliet and the National Shrine of St Therese in Darien. There is also the Ukrainian Orthodox Church in Glendale Heights.

The Theosophical Society in America in Wheaton, the North American headquarters of the Theosophical Society Adyar, provides lectures and classes on theosophy, meditation, yoga, Eastern and New Age spirituality. Islamic mosques are located in Villa Park, Naperville (two mosques), Glendale Heights, Willowbrook, Westmont, Lombard, Bolingbrook, Addison, Woodale, West Chicago, and unincorporated Glen Ellyn. There are Hindu temples in Bartlett, Bensenville, Bloomingdale, Carol Stream, Itasca and Medinah, and an Arya Samaj center in West Chicago. There is a Nichiren Shōshū Zen Buddhist temple in West Chicago and a Theravada Buddhist Temple, called the Buddha-Dharma Meditation Center, in Willowbrook. There is also a Reform synagogue, Congregation Etz Chaim, in Lombard and an unaffiliated one in Naperville, called Congregation Beth Shalom.

Economy
DuPage County is the primary location of the Illinois Technology and Research Corridor. It is home to many large corporations, including:

 Ace Hardware (Oak Brook)
 Arthur J. Gallagher & Co. (Itasca) (Fortune 1000)
 BP (formerly British Petroleum) (Warrenville)
 DeVry Inc. (Oakbrook Terrace) (NYSE)
 Dover Corporation (Downers Grove) (Fortune 500)
 Eby-Brown (Naperville)
 Hub Group (Oak Brook) (Fortune 1000)
 Molex (Lisle) (Fortune 1000)
 Nalco Water (Naperville) (Fortune 1000)
 Namco Cybertainment (Bensenville)
 Navistar International (Lisle) (Fortune Global 500)
 Nicor Gas (Naperville) (Fortune 1000)
 OfficeMax (Naperville) (Fortune 500)
 Sara Lee Corporation (Downers Grove) (Fortune 500)
 Tellabs (Naperville) (Fortune 1000)
 Ty Warner (Beanie Babies) (Westmont)

Shopping malls in DuPage County include Oakbrook Center, which is the largest open-air mall in the nation, Fox Valley Mall, Yorktown Center, Town Square Wheaton, and Stratford Square Mall. In addition, many of DuPage County's towns have prosperous and quaint downtown areas, especially in Naperville, Glen Ellyn, Elmhurst, Wheaton, Downers Grove and Hinsdale, which are mixed with boutiques, upscale chain stores and restaurants.

National Laboratories

Fermilab, which has the world's second-highest-energy particle accelerator, is in Batavia, where it straddles the border between Kane and DuPage counties. 

Argonne National Laboratory, one of the United States government's oldest and largest science and engineering research laboratories, is in unincorporated, southeast DuPage County. Both laboratories conduct tours of their facilities.

Arts and culture

Architecture
The 31-story Oakbrook Terrace Tower in Oakbrook Terrace, designed by Helmut Jahn, is the tallest building in Illinois outside of Chicago. The Elmhurst Art Museum is housed in a Mies Van Der Rohe building. There is a Frank Lloyd Wright house in Elmhurst. Bochasanwasi Akshar Purushottam Swaminarayan Sanstha, a conservative Hindu sect, has built BAPS Shri Swaminarayan Mandir Chicago, a large, intricately carved, marble temple in Bartlett. There are some Sears Catalog Homes in Downers Grove and Villa Park. The Byzantine-style clubhouse of the Medinah Country Club is also an architectural highlight of the county. Lombard is home to over thirty Lustron prefabricated steel homes.

Museums and historical sites

Historical museums in DuPage County include:
 Cantigny Park and First Division Museum, on the former estate of Chicago Tribune magnate Robert R. McCormick (Wheaton)
 Downers Grove Museum (Downers Grove)
 DuPage County Historical Museum, formerly the Adams Memorial Library (Wheaton)
 Graue Mill (Oak Brook)
 Gregg House Museum (Westmont)
 Itasca Historical Depot Museum (Itasca)
 Kline Creek Farm (West Chicago)
 Mayslake Peabody Estate (Oak Brook)
 The Museums at Lisle Station Park (Lisle)
 Naper Settlement (Naperville)
 Villa Park Historical Society Museum (Villa Park)
 West Chicago's City Museum (West Chicago)

Specialty museums in DuPage County include:
 DuPage Children's Museum (Naperville)
 Elmhurst Art Museum, which includes Mies Van Der Rohe's McCormick House (Elmhurst)
 Wheaton College (Wheaton)
 Billy Graham Center
 Marion E. Wade Center

Historical sites include:
 Downtown Hinsdale Historic District
 DuPage County Courthouse (Wheaton)
 Glen Ellyn Main Street Historic District
 Joe Naper's General Store (Naperville)
 Naperville Historic District
 Old Nichols Library (Naperville)
 Pioneer Park, monument to white settlers of DuPage County and site of Bailey Hobson's mill (Naperville)
 Stacy's Tavern (Glen Ellyn)
 Wayne Village Historic District

Music and theater
DuPage also plays host to a rich local music scene. Some of the better-known bands to come out of the area include The Hush Sound, Lucky Boys Confusion, and Plain White T's.

Oakbrook Terrace's Drury Lane Theatre is an important live theatre in DuPage County. The Tivoli Theatre, one of the first theaters in the United States to be equipped with sound, is still in use in Downers Grove. In addition to showing movies, the Tivoli is home to several local performing arts groups.

Parks and recreation

The Forest Preserve District of DuPage County owns and manages  of prairies, woodlands and wetlands. More than 4 million visitors each year enjoy 60 forest preserves, 145 miles of trails, and five education centers.

Local urban parks include Lombard's Lilacia Park, Naperville's Centennial Beach, Woodridge's Cypress Cove Family Aquatic Park and Wheaton's Cosley Zoo. Privately funded attractions include Lisle's Morton Arboretum.

In the 1980s, DuPage County also had another major attraction, Ebenezer Floppen Slopper's Wonderful Water slides in Oakbrook Terrace, which today, stands abandoned and neglected.

The Illinois Prairie Path, a  rail-to-trail multi-use path, runs through Cook, DuPage and Kane Counties. It intersects with the Great Western Trail at several points, as well as the Fox River Trail at a few points.

DuPage golf courses include: Wheaton's Chicago Golf Club, Arrowhead Golf Club and Cantigny Golf courses; the Medinah Country Club; the Village Links and Glen Oak Country Club of Glen Ellyn; Addison's Oak Meadows; Oak Brook's Oak Brook Golf Club, Butler National Golf Club, and Butterfield Country Club; Wood Dale's Maple Meadows; Westmont's Green Meadows; Lisle's River Bend (9 holes); West Chicago's St. Andrews Golf & Country Club and Winfield's Klein Creek Golf Club, among others.

Government
 The powers of the County Board include managing county funds and business, levying taxes, and appropriating funds. The County Board exercises powers not assigned to other elected officials or other boards.

The county is divided into six districts. Each district elects three members to the County Board in staggered two-year and four-year terms. The Chairman of the County Board is the chief executive officer of DuPage County, and is elected countywide every four years.

DuPage County is part of Regional Office of Education #19 which is coterminous with the county's corporate boundaries.

The County Board is controlled by the Democratic Party by an 11 to 7 margin.

Politics
DuPage County was historically a stronghold of the Republican Party, and a classic bastion of suburban conservatism. In recent years, DuPage County has joined other suburban counties outside large U.S. cities trending Democratic in presidential election years since the 1990s.  The county continues to lean Republican in state and local politics, however in the 2018 Illinois gubernatorial election, J. B. Pritzker became the first Democratic candidate for the governorship to win the county in more than 100 years.

National politics 

The county supported Barack Obama, a Chicago resident, in 2008 and 2012 (albeit narrowly in 2012). Obama was the first Democratic presidential nominee to win the county since Franklin Pierce in 1852. The only time prior to 2008 that a Republican had failed to win the county was in 1912, when the GOP was mortally divided and former President and Progressive Party nominee Theodore Roosevelt won over half the county's vote.

DuPage County has historically been a fiscally and socially conservative Republican stronghold, though in recent years has become more politically liberal especially on issues of race and immigration. DuPage County has been shifting more Democratic, with Joe Biden winning 58% of the vote in 2020. DuPage County has not voted for a Republican candidate for president since 2004. Donald Trump was the first Republican nominee for President since 1912 to get less than 40% of the DuPage County vote, both in the 2016 and 2020 general elections. Many DuPage County communities which normally vote Republican, including but not limited to Naperville, Lisle, Wheaton, Glen Ellyn, Carol Stream, Downers Grove, and Elmhurst did not support Donald Trump in 2016. In December 2019, shortly after the U.S. House of Representatives voted to impeach Donald Trump, Carol Stream-based Christianity Today published a controversial editorial calling for the removal of Trump from office, citing the need to hold him to the same standards to which they held Bill Clinton in the 1990s (who was the last Democratic nominee for President to get less than 40% of the DuPage County vote).

In the U.S. House of Representatives, DuPage County is in the 5th, 6th, 8th, 11th and 14th districts. In the 2018 general election, despite the county's historical Republican dominance, Democrats won every congressional district within the county.

Local politics 
Republicans historically controlled local politics in DuPage County from the nineteenth century until modern times. During the twentieth century, Democrats only held countywide office twice. In 1934 William Robinson was elected Circuit Clerk and Arthur Hellyer was elected Treasurer. That year also saw the first ever Democratic majority county board and only such majority that century. Robinson and Hellyer each served one term; Robinson lost his bid for a full term in 1936 and Hellyer left the Treasurer's office to make a failed bid for probate judge in 1938. In 2018, as part of a larger suburban realignment, Democratic candidate Jean Kaczmarek won the election for County Clerk and Daniel Hebreard won the President of the Forest Preserve District of DuPage County.

During that same period Democrats were sporadically elected to the county board and township government. In 1972, Don Carroll was elected to the County Board. In the Democratic wave of 1974, Jane Spirgel, Mary Eleanor Wall, and Elaine Libovicz were elected. All four were from the northeastern portion of DuPage, which at that time was the most Democratic region of the county. Eventually, Republicans regained all seats on the board when Jane Spirgel ran for Illinois Secretary of State with Adlai Stevenson III under the Solidarity Party banner. In 2000, Linda J. Bourke Hilbert was elected. Like her 1970s counterparts, she was from the northeastern portion of the county. During the 2008 Democratic wave, three Democrats were elected to the board. After the initial Obama wave, Republicans reasserted themselves on the board and by 2017 Democrats held only one of the eighteen board seats. In the 2018 general election, Democrats won seven seats as well as the offices of County Clerk and Forest Preserve District President.

In 1973, a slate of Democrats took eight of nine offices in Addison Township. This feat would not be replicated until 2017 when Democratic candidates won a majority of offices in Naperville and Lisle townships. Between these two victories, Democrats only held two township offices. Mark Starkovich served as York Township Supervisor from 1989-1993 and Martin McManamon has served as Wayne Township Highway Commissioner since 2013.

In 2020, Democrats won control of the DuPage County Board, expanding on their 2018 lead.

Education

Colleges and universities

The College of DuPage, in Glen Ellyn, is one of the largest community colleges in the United States. Wheaton College is one of the most well-known and respected evangelical Christian colleges in the country. Benedictine University, Elmhurst University and North Central College also have long and respected histories in their communities.

Other prominent colleges and universities include: Midwestern University and the Chicago College of Osteopathic Medicine in Downers Grove; National University of Health Sciences in Lombard; Northern Seminary and National Louis University in Lisle; the Addison and Naperville campuses of DeVry University; the Naperville campus of Northern Illinois University; and the Wheaton campus of Illinois Institute of Technology.

School districts
The DuPage County Regional Office of Education provides regulatory and compliance oversight, quality services and support, and a variety of other services and information to the public schools within forty-two school districts of the county that provide education to over 161,000 students in 245 schools.

The following is a list of school districts that not only includes those supported by the DuPage County Regional Office of Education, but includes others which may have schools and/or administrative headquarters outside of DuPage County but which have any territory, no matter how slight, within the county:

K-12:
 Chicago Public School District 299 - Territory at Chicago O'Hare International Airport in DuPage County boundaries
 Community Unit School District 200
 Elmhurst School District 205
 Indian Prairie Community Unit School District 204
 Lisle Community Unit School District 202
 Naperville Community Unit District 203
 School District U-46
 St. Charles Community Unit School District 303
 Westmont Community Unit School District 201

Secondary:
 Community High School District 94
 Community High School District 99
 DuPage High School District 88
 Fenton Community High School District 100
 Glenbard Township High School District 87
 Hinsdale Township High School District 86
 Lake Park Community High School District 108
 Lemont Township High School District 210

Elementary:
 Addison School District 4
 Benjamin School District 25
 Bensenville School District 2
 Bloomingdale School District 13
 Butler School District 53
 Cass School District 63
 Center Cass School District 66
 Community Consolidated School District 93
 Community Consolidated School District 180
 Darien School District 61
 Downers Grove Grade School District 58
 Glen Ellyn Community Consolidated School District 89
 Glen Ellyn School District 41
 Gower School District 62
 Hinsdale Community Consolidated School District 181
 Itasca School District 10
 Keeneyville School District 20
 Lemont-Bromberek Combined School District 113A
 Lombard School District 44
 Maercker School District 60
 Marquardt School District 15
 Medinah School District 11
 Queen Bee School District 16
 Roselle School District 12
 Salt Creek School District 48
 Villa Park School District 45
 West Chicago School District 33
 Winfield School District 34
 Wood Dale School District 7
 Woodridge School District 68

High schools
Dupage County is home to many public high schools, such as:

 Addison Trail High School
 Bartlett High School
 Downers Grove North High School
 Downers Grove South High School
 Fenton High School
 Glenbard East High School
 Glenbard North High School
 Glenbard South High School
 Glenbard West High School
 Hinsdale Central High School
 Hinsdale South High School
 Lake Park High School
 Lisle High School
 Metea Valley High School
 Naperville North High School
 Naperville Central High School
 Waubonsie Valley High School
 West Chicago Community High School
 Westmont High School
 Wheaton North High School
 Wheaton Warrenville South High School
 Willowbrook High School
 York Community High School

Additionally, DuPage County is home to several private high schools, including:

 Benet Academy
 Clapham School
 College Preparatory School of America
 Driscoll Catholic High School (closed 2009)
 IC Catholic Prep
 Islamic Foundation School
 Montini Catholic High School
 St. Francis High School
 Timothy Christian School
 Wheaton Academy

Infrastructure

Health care
DuPage hospitals include: Central DuPage Hospital in Winfield; Edward Hospital in Naperville; Elmhurst Memorial Hospital in Elmhurst; Adventist Hinsdale Hospital in Hinsdale; Advocate Good Samaritan Hospital in Downers Grove; Adventist GlenOaks Hospital in Glendale Heights; and Marianjoy Rehabilitation Hospital in Wheaton.

Transportation

Aside from the part of O'Hare International Airport that is located inside the county, DuPage also has many railroads and several small airports, including DuPage Airport. DuPage is served by the Pace bus system. DuPage County is also well-covered by Metra, the Chicago-area commuter rail system. Three of Metra's eleven lines pass through the county: Milwaukee District West Line, Union Pacific West Line, and BNSF Line. Nineteen Metra stations are within DuPage County.

Major highways
DuPage County is served by five Interstate Highways, three US Highways, and nine Illinois Routes.

 
 
 
 
 
  US 66
 
 
 
 
 
 
 
 
 
 
 
  Army Trail Road
  Stearns Road

North–south roads (from west to east) include: IL 59 (Sutton Road), IL 53 (Rohlwing Road), I-355 (Veterans Memorial Tollway) and IL 83 (Kingery Highway). East–west roads (from south to north) include: I-55 (Stevenson Expressway) I-88 (Ronald Reagan Memorial Tollway), US 34 (Ogden Avenue), IL 56 (Butterfield Road), IL 38 (Roosevelt Road), IL 64 (North Avenue), Army Trail Road, US 20 (Lake Street), IL 19 (Irving Park Road) and IL 390 (Elgin–O'Hare Expressway), which begins at the Thorndale Avenue exit on I-290 and ends on Lake Street, in Hanover Park. I-294 partially enters DuPage County on its eastern border between Westchester, in Cook County, and Oak Brook, in DuPage County. Only the southbound lanes enter the county though. Historic U.S. Route 66 crosses through the southeast portion of the county near Darien and Willowbrook.

Communities

Cities

 Aurora (part)
 Batavia (part)
 Chicago (O'Hare Airport)
 Darien
 Elmhurst (mostly)
 Naperville (mostly)
 Oakbrook Terrace
 St. Charles (part)
 Warrenville
 West Chicago
 Wheaton
 Wood Dale

Villages

 Addison
 Bartlett (mostly)
 Bensenville (mostly)
 Bloomingdale
 Bolingbrook (part)
 Burr Ridge (part)
 Carol Stream
 Clarendon Hills
 Downers Grove
 Elk Grove Village (part)
 Glendale Heights
 Glen Ellyn
 Hanover Park (part)
 Hinsdale (mostly)
 Itasca
 Lemont (part)
 Lisle
 Lombard
 Oak Brook (mostly)
 Roselle (mostly)
 Schaumburg (part)
 Villa Park
 Wayne (part)
 Westmont
 Willowbrook
 Willow Springs (part)
 Winfield
 Woodridge (mostly)

Unincorporated communities

 Belmont
 Butterfield
 Cloverdale
 Eola
 Flowerfield
 Fullersburg 
 Keeneyville
 Lakewood
 Medinah
 Munger
 North Glen Ellyn
 Palisades
 South Elmhurst
 Swift
 York Center

Townships
DuPage County has nine townships as well as part of an independent city within its boundaries, their populations at the 2010 census are:

 Downers Grove Township - 146,795
 York Township - 123,449
 Milton Township - 117,067
 Lisle Township - 116,268
 Bloomingdale Township - 111,899
 Naperville Township - 100,019
 Addison Township - 88,612
 Wayne Township - 66,582 
 Winfield Township - 46,233
 City of Chicago - DuPage side is nonresidential

Ghost towns/Neighborhoods

 Gostyn
 Ontarioville
 Tedens
 Weston

See also

 List of counties in Illinois
 List of Illinois townships

References

External links

 
 DuPage Convention & Visitors Bureau
 DuPage County Historical Society
 DuPage Event Center and Fairgrounds in Wheaton
 Forest Preserve District of DuPage County
 Forest Preserve District of DuPage County–Golf Facilities

 
1839 establishments in Illinois
Chicago metropolitan area
Illinois counties
Populated places established in 1839